Porterdale is a town in Newton County, Georgia, the United States. The population was 1,429 at the 2010 census.

History
Porterdale was incorporated on March 10, 1917, and was named after Oliver S. Porter, a local mill owner.

Geography
Porterdale is located at  (33.569585, -83.897968).

Demographics

2020 census

As of the 2020 United States census, there were 1,799 people, 667 households, and 370 families residing in the city.

2000 census
As of the census of 2000, there were 1,281 people, 463 households, and 333 families residing in the town. The racial makeup of the town was 92.58% White, 4.92% African American, 0.31% Native American, 0.94% Asian, 0.55% from other races, and 0.70% from two or more races. Hispanic or Latino of any race were 1.87% of the population.

There were 463 households, out of which 33.5% had children under the age of 18 living with them, 47.7% were married couples living together, 18.1% had a female householder with no husband present, and 27.9% were non-families. 23.3% of all households were made up of individuals, and 13.2% had someone living alone who was 65 years of age or older. The average household size was 2.77 and the average family size was 3.22.

In the town, the population was spread out, with 26.6% under the age of 18, 10.5% from 18 to 24, 28.6% from 25 to 44, 20.5% from 45 to 64, and 13.9% who were 65 years of age or older. The median age was 34 years. For every 100 females, there were 94.4 males. For every 100 females age 18 and over, there were 91.4 males.

The median income for a household in the town was $23,967, and the median income for a family was $30,398. Males had a median income of $28,409 versus $20,962 for females. The per capita income for the town was $10,812. About 18.7% of families and 22.5% of the population were below the poverty line, including 27.6% of those under age 18 and 15.6% of those age 65 or over.

Porterdale, Ga is one of many small towns that were based around textile mills. The mills were the centerpiece of the area and employed the majority of the local population. These towns were largely founded in the early 1900s. The advent of the global economy has sent these "mill towns" into economic collapse in the latter part of the 20th century. Porterdale is mainly known for its textile mill which still runs today. Formerly the Bibb Company and later Dan River, Porterdale resides straddling the Yellow River where the Mill used to get its power from. The old part of the mill which is alongside the dam on the Yellow River is Mill Loft apartments. In the eighties and nineties, the mill alongside the dam was a flea market that housed many events including wrestling. The nature of the closeness of the houses in this "mill town" extend to the closeness of the community.

Infrastructure

Major Highways
 Georgia State Route 81

Notable people

 Robert C. Blankenship was decorated with the Dutch Military Order of William (the Dutch equivalent of the Congressional Medal of Honor) for his bravery in Operation Market Garden; born in Porterdale.
 Raymond Moody psychologist and author who coined the term near-death experience; born in Porterdale.

References

External links
 
 Porterdale, Georgia Website Portal style website, Government, Business, Library, Recreation and more
 City-Data.com Comprehensive Statistical Data and more about Tipton

Cities in Newton County, Georgia
Cities in Georgia (U.S. state)